The Damascene, also known as the Istanbullu pigeon, is a breed of fancy pigeon developed over many years of selective breeding. Damascenes, along with other varieties of domesticated pigeons, are all descendants of the rock dove (also called rock pigeon) (Columba livia).
The breed is thought to have originated in Damascus, Syria and hence its name.

Appearance 
The Damascene is entirely white or silver-grey, with a black tail tip and wing bars. The under feathers of the neck are dark grey, and so is the skin. The primary flight feathers grow darker towards the tips. The head and breast should have no markings.

Damascenes may also be grouse-legged, with a short layer of feathers covering the legs, but clean legs are preferred by breeders.

See also 

List of pigeon breeds

References

Pigeon breeds
Damascus
Pigeon breeds originating in Syria

External links
Pigeonpedia - Damascene Pigeon Breed Guide